The Cathedral of St. John the Baptist in Washington, D.C. is a church of the Russian Orthodox Church Outside Russia. The parish was founded in 1949, while the church building was completed in 1958.

References

Russian Orthodox church buildings in the United States
Russian Orthodox cathedrals in the United States
Cathedrals in Washington, D.C.
Christian organizations established in 1949
Churches completed in 1958
Russian-American culture in Washington, D.C.
Eastern Orthodoxy in Washington, D.C.
1949 establishments in Washington, D.C.
Russian Orthodox Church Outside of Russia